Layqa (Aymara and Quechua) is a term employed prior to the Spanish Conquest to denote a ceremonial healer from the Quechua speaking central Peruvian highlands. After the arrival of the European Inquisitors, Catholic priests, began referring to all Quechua magico-religious practitioners by this title, equating the layqa with ‘sorcerer’ or ‘witch.’ Early references to the layqa appear in the Spanish Chronicles, as well as the Huarochirí Manuscript, commissioned in 1608 by a clerical prosecutor and Inquisitor, Father Francisco de Avila, who used it for the persecution of indigenous worships and beliefs. Several contemporary investigators, including psychiatrist and anthropologist Ina Rösing, and medical anthropologist Alberto Villoldo have attempted to clarify that the layqa in the prehispanic world were not 'witches', but traditional healers and wisdom

See also 
 Yatiri

References

  The Huarochirí Manuscript, A Testament of Ancient and Colonial Andean Religion,
Translation from the Quechua by Frank Salomon and George L. Urioste, University of Texas Press, 1991
 Die Verbannung der Trauer, Ina Rösing, Greno 10/20–15, 79
 The Four Agreements, Hay House, 2007.

Bolivian culture
Peruvian culture